The Dicranolasmatidae are a family of harvestmen with 16 described species in a single genus, Dicranolasma.

Description
Species of Dicranolasma range in body length from three to 6.4 mm. Most parts of the body are encrusted with soil particles. The anterior region features a large headlike "hood" with the eyes in center, which consists of two curved processes. The chelicerae and pedipalps are both hidden under the hood in adults and about half as long as the body. The legs are short. Immature forms are quite different from adults. The immature form of D. opilionoides was even described as a different genus (Amopaum). The hood develops only gradually, so in young Dicranolasma the relatively longer pedipalps are carried outside the hood.

Distribution
Dicranolasmatidae occur mainly in the Mediterranean region northward to the southern Alps, the Carpathians, eastward to the Caucasus and Iraq, the Levant and southward to western North Africa.

Relationships
The Dicranolasmatidae are closely related to the Trogulidae and Nemastomatidae, with Trogulus probably sister to Dicranolasma.

The genus consists of five species groups:
 D. scabrum group — Aegean Islands, Turkey, Caucasia, Middle East
 D. scabrum, D. opilionoides, D. hoberlandti, D. giljarovi, D. kurdistanum, D. thracium, D. ressli, D. ponticum, D. cretaeum.
 D. mladeni group
 D. cristatum group
 D. soerensenii group
 D. apuanum group

Name
The genus name Dicranolasma is a combination of Ancient Greek di "two", kranion "head", and elasma "plate", referring to the distinctive bifurcated hood of the genus.

Species
The 16 recognized species of Dicranolasma are listed here, along with their type locality:

Dicranolasma apuanum Marcellino, 1970 - Italy
Dicranolasma cretaeum Gruber, 1998 - Crete
Dicranolasma cristatum Thorell, 1876 - Italy
Dicranolasma giljarovi Silhavý, 1966 - Russia
Dicranolasma hirtum Loman, 1894 - Italy
Dicranolasma hoberlandti Silhavý, 1956 - Turkey
Dicranolasma kurdistanum Starega, 1970 - Iraq
Dicranolasma mlandeni I. M. Karaman, 1990 - Montenegro
Dicranolasma opilionoides (L. Koch, 1867) - Greece
Dicranolasma pauper Dahl, 1903 - Italy
Dicranolasma ponticum Gruber, 1998 - Turkey
Dicranolasma ressli Gruber, 1998 - Turkey
Dicranolasma scabrum (Herbst, 1799) - Romania
Dicranolasma soerenseni Thorell, 1876 - France
Dicranolasma thracium Starega, 1976 - Bulgaria
Dicranolasma verhoeffi Dahl, 1903 - Bosnia and Herzegovina

References

Harvestman families